Veloxidium is a genus of parasitic alveolates in the phylum Apicomplexa. Species in this genus infect marine invertebrates.

Taxonomy

This species was described in 2012 by Wakeman and Leander.

There is one species in this genus - Veloxidium leptosynaptae.

Description

This species infects the sea cucumber Leptosynapta clarki.

Life cycle

The parasite infects the gastrointestinal tract and is presumably transmitted by the orofaecal route but the details of this mechanism are presently unknown.

References

Apicomplexa genera